Eddie Lang (born Salvatore Massaro; October 25, 1902 – March 26, 1933) was an American musician who is credited as the father of jazz guitar. During the 1920s, he gave the guitar a prominence it previously lacked as a solo instrument, as part of a band or orchestra, and as accompaniment for vocalists. He recorded duets with guitarists Lonnie Johnson and Carl Kress and jazz violinist Joe Venuti, and played rhythm guitar in the Paul Whiteman Orchestra and was the favoured accompanist of Bing Crosby.

Biography

The son of an Italian-American instrument maker, Lang was born in Philadelphia, Pennsylvania, and grew up with violinist Joe Venuti. His first instrument was violin when he was seven. He performed on violin in 1917 and became a member of a trio. In 1920, he dropped the violin for banjo and worked with Charlie Kerr, then Bert Estlow, Vic D'Ippolito, and Billy Lustig's Scranton Siren Orchestra. A few years later, he dropped the banjo for guitar when he became a member of the Mound City Blue Blowers led by Red McKenzie. He recorded one of the first solos in 1924 on "Deep 2nd Street Blues". His performances with McKenzie's band drew attention, and he found many jobs as a freelance guitarist.  Before Lang, the guitar hadn't been a prominent instrument in jazz bands and dance orchestras.

Lang and Joe Venuti recorded with Roger Wolfe Kahn and Jean Goldkette and performed with the Adrian Rollini Orchestra. Lang recorded with blues guitarist Lonnie Johnson under the name Blind Willie Dunn to hide his race and as a tribute to blues guitarist Blind Lemon Jefferson. He also worked with Frankie Trumbauer, Hoagy Carmichael, Annette Hanshaw, Red Nichols, Jack Pettis, Bessie Smith, and Clarence Williams.

Friendship with Bing Crosby
In 1929, Lang and Venuti became members of the Paul Whiteman Orchestra, and again Lang made an impact. Whiteman was impressed by his ability to learn songs quickly, though Lang had little education and could not read music. During the same year, vocalist Bing Crosby made his first solo recordings. His guitarist was Snoozer Quinn, but for the second session he invited Lang. Their friendship grew when Crosby joined the Whiteman Orchestra on its trip west to Hollywood to make the movie King of Jazz, in which Lang and Venuti appeared. In 1930, when Crosby was looking for a job in radio, he insisted on having Lang as his accompaniment. Aside from his friendship with Crosby, he had experience accompanying vocalists, such as Rube Bloom. When Crosby toured soon after, Lang sat on a stool next to him to share the microphone. Lang's wife Kitty, a Ziegfeld girl, was friends with Crosby's wife, Dixie. He became a regular in Crosby's orchestra in 1932, the same year he appeared in the movie The Big Broadcast (1932).

Death
Lang suffered from occasional laryngitis, chronic sore throat, and digestion problems. After a doctor recommended a tonsillectomy, Crosby urged Lang to have the operation. Assured that the operation was routine, Lang entered Park West Hospital in Manhattan, but he never awoke from the surgery. He died at the age of thirty in 1933. The cause of his death is uncertain. Lang is buried at Holy Cross Cemetery in Yeadon, Pennsylvania.

Influence

Lang, along with New Orleans born Lonnie Johnson, were among the first single-string guitar soloists. He played the melody on one string while adding occasional chords. He demonstrated that the guitar could be an instrument for accompaniment like the piano.

While most bands of the time had a banjo player, Lang was skilled enough to make his acoustic guitar heard against the other instruments. He was so influential that, according to George Van Eps, banjo players had no choice but to switch to guitar.

Lang played Gibson L-4 and L-5 guitars.

Honors
In 1977, Lang's recording of "Singin' the Blues" with Frankie Trumbauer and Bix Beiderbecke, was inducted into the Grammy Hall of Fame and in 2006 was placed on the U.S. Library of Congress National Recording Registry. He was inducted into the ASCAP Jazz Wall of Fame (1986) and the Big Band and Jazz Hall of Fame (2010).

On October 23, 2016, Philadelphia's Mural Arts organization dedicated the mural Eddie Lang: The Father of Jazz Guitar, by artist Jared Bader. The mural stands by Lang's childhood home and the James Campbell School that stood at 8th and Fitzwater where Lang learned to play. The mural was championed by area guitarist Richard Barnes, who started "Eddie Lang Day in Philadelphia" in 2010, an annual charity event.

Compositions
Lang's compositions, based on the Red Hot Jazz database, include "Wild Cat" with Joe Venuti, "Perfect" with Frank Signorelli, "April Kisses", "Sunshine", "Melody Man's Dream", "Goin' Places", "Black and Blue Bottom", "Bull Frog Moan", "Rainbow Dreams", "Feelin' My Way", "Eddie's Twister", "Really Blue", "Penn Beach Blues", "Wild Dog", "Pretty Trix", "A Mug of Ale", "Apple Blossoms", "Beating the Dog", "To To Blues", "Running Ragged", "Kicking the Cat", "Cheese and Crackers", "Doin' Things", "Blue Guitars", "Guitar Blues" with Lonnie Johnson, "Hot Fingers", "Have to Change Keys to Play These Blues", "A Handful of Riffs", "Blue Room", "Deep Minor Rhythm Stomp", "Two-Tone Stomp". "Midnight Call Blues", "Four String Joe", "Goin' Home", and "Pickin' My Way" with Carl Kress.

Discography

Albums
 Stringing the Blues with Joe Venuti (CBS, 1962)
 Jazz Guitar Virtuoso (Yazoo, 1977)
 A Handful of Riffs (ASV/Living Era, 1989)
 Pioneers of Jazz Guitar 1927–1938 (Yazoo, 1992)
 Blue Guitars, Vols. 1 & 2 with Lonnie Johnson (BGO, 1997)
 The Quintessential Eddie Lang (Timeless, 1998)
 The New York Sessions 1926–1935 with Joe Venuti (JSP, 2003)
 The Classic Columbia and Okeh Joe Venuti and Eddie Lang (Mosaic, 2002)
 1927–1932 (Chronological Classics, 2004)

Singles

Bibliography
 Berend, Dave. Seven Original Compositions for the Guitar by the Great Eddie Lang: Transcribed and Arranged for Plectrum Guitar Solos with Guitar Accompaniment. Robbins Music, 1961.
 Mazzoletti, Adriano. Eddie Lang: Stringin' the Blues. Rome, Italy: Pantheon Editore, 1997.
 Peters, Mike. The Classic Columbia and Okeh Joe Venuti and Eddie Lang Sessions. Notes by Mike Peters, Marty Grosz, Richard M. Sudhalter, Scott Wenzel. Mosaic Records, 2002.
 Sallis, James, editor. Jazz Guitar: An Anthology. Quill Publishers, 1984.
 Worsfold, Sally-Ann. The Quintessential Eddie Lang, 1925–1932. Timeless Records, 1997.

References

External links
 Eddie Lang: Profiles in Jazz at The Syncopated Times
 Eddie Lang (1902-1933) at the Red Hot Jazz Archive
 Photo of Lang with Bing Crosby
 Eddie Lang recordings at the Discography of American Historical Recordings.
 

1902 births
1933 deaths
20th-century American guitarists
American jazz guitarists
Okeh Records artists
American people of Italian descent
American jazz musicians
Guitarists from Philadelphia
American male guitarists
Jazz musicians from Pennsylvania
20th-century American male musicians
American male jazz musicians
Victor Recording Orchestra members